Statistics of Nemzeti Bajnokság I in the 1941–42 season.

Overview
It was contested by 16 teams, and Csepel SC won the championship.

League standings

Results

References
Hungary - List of final tables (RSSSF)

Nemzeti Bajnokság I seasons
Hun
1941–42 in Hungarian football